Grenada  compete at the 2022 World Athletics Championships in Eugene, United States, from 15 to 24 July 2022.

Medalists

Results
Grenada has entered 3 athletes.

Men 
Track and road events

Field events

Combined events – Decathlon

References

External links
Oregon22｜WCH 22｜World Athletics

Nations at the 2022 World Athletics Championships
World Championships in Athletics
Grenada at the World Championships in Athletics